Väte Church is a medieval Lutheran church in Väte on the Swedish island of Gotland.

History and architecture
Väte Church was built during the 14th century. The choir and sacristy are the oldest parts of the church, from circa 1300, while the nave dates from the middle of the 14th century. A tower was planned but never built. The presently visible church probably replaced an earlier, Romanesque church, of which several remains have  been incorporated with the presently visible, mostly Gothic church. No major alterations have been made to Väte Church since the Middle Ages. The church spire was constructed in 1914.

The church is built of limestone. The exterior is partially decorated with Romanesque sculpture (the northern portal, decorative reliefs and window dressings), and has two Gothic southern portals with finely sculpted capitals. Inside, the church is decorated with murals. One set dates from the 14th century, another by the so-called Master of the Passion of Christ (Passionsmästaren)  from the 15th century and a third by the so-called Master of 1520 (similar to murals in Alva and Lau churches). The octagonal baptismal font is of  sandstone and dated to the 12th century. The altarpiece  was painted in 1780 by Johan Niklas Weller (1723-1785) who also painted the altar in 1782. The triumphal crucifix is from the 13th century.
 
The church has undergone restorative works three times during the 20th century: in 1927-28, in 1956 was under the direction of  architect Nils Arne Rosén (1920-1998) and the work in 1965 under  architect Olle Karth (1905-1965).

References

Further reading

External links

 Official site (in Swedish)

Romanesque architecture in Sweden
Gothic architecture in Sweden
Churches in Gotland County
Churches in the Diocese of Visby
Church frescos in Sweden
14th-century churches in Sweden
Churches converted from the Roman Catholic Church to the Church of Sweden